Below is a list and summary of the former state highways.

State Route 62

The road first appeared on a 1936 map and it was deleted from the state highway system in 1971 because of the closure of the mine in Chloride. The road is still in use today as Mohave County Road 125.

Major intersections

State Route 63

State Route 63 was a state highway in northeastern Arizona.  The route first appeared on a state map in 1932 running through the Petrified Forest National Park east of Winslow between then U.S. Route 66 and U.S. Route 260. The road was decertified in 1951 and is now maintained by the National Park Service.

SR 63 then appeared again on a state map in 1961 along a route from U.S. Route 66 in Sanders northwest 15 miles. In 1970, it extended north to then U.S. 164, which became part of U.S. Route 160 later that year. The route disappeared on maps on May 11, 1981 when the route became U.S. Route 191.

State Route 65

State Route 65 was a state highway in northern Arizona originally traveling in a north–south direction between Winslow and the Coconino National Forest. In 1961, it extended to State Route 264 in Second Mesa. In 1966, it extended to State Route 87 at Strawberry Junction north of Payson. This road became part of SR 87 in 1967, when the last section of paving was completed to link it with SR 87.

State Route T-69
This was the link between the eastern end of Interstate 10 where the Maricopa Freeway ended at 40th Street, and Arizona routes 87 and 93 near Mesa and Chandler. When the Maricopa Freeway was built and opened in 1962, it ended at 40th Street. The Arizona Highway Department apparently wanted to post a truck route around Tempe and Mesa. SR T-69 was signed through the farm fields on 40th Street south to Baseline Road, and then east on Baseline to Country Club Drive in Mesa (Arizona Avenue in Chandler), where it linked with routes 87 and 93. For a few months in about 1970, T-69 was the northern terminus for an unmarked, orphan section of Interstate 10, when four miles (6 km) of freeway were built south from Baseline to Williams Field Road (now Chandler Blvd.).  T-69 was not marked as "Temporary I-10", nor was it marked with "TO 10" signs. Interstate 10 in the 1960s simply was not marked between Phoenix and Picacho, and remained unsigned until the interstate was opened from Baseline Road in Guadalupe to Picacho in about 1970. T-69 west of Guadalupe remained a state highway for a few more months, until the "Broadway Curve" section of Interstate 10 opened; during this period it was co-signed as the route "TO 10". T-69 was erased when the Phoenix-Tucson freeway was opened.

Arizona Highway Department maps of the era referred to the route as TEMP 69, although State Route 69 never extended south or east beyond the southern end of the Black Canyon Freeway, and T-69 never linked to Route 69.

State Route 76

State Route 76 was a short state highway in eastern central Arizona, United States that connected State Route 77 and San Manuel with a detached southern segment connecting Pomerene to Benson. Although SR 76 was an even numbered highway, it was signed as north–south due to its orientation. Starting in 1967, there was a planned extension to Benson which would have originally been State Route 176. SR 176 was ultimately never designated as a state highway, with the proposed route becoming part of SR 76 proper in 1970. This was done in order to secure a Secondary Federal Aid Highway designation and federal funding for the proposed route, which had already been allocated to SR 76.

Around 1969, SR 76 was extended further southeast from San Manuel over Peppersauce Wash. A bridge was constructed over Peppersauce Wash and grading of a further section of SR 76 began through Redfield Canyon towards the Pinal–Pima County Line. The rest of the highway from Peppersauce Wash to San Manuel Mine had also been improved and paved, with two culverts and a railroad overpass being constructed on the short section north of SR 77. In Cochise County, a section of Pomerene Road near Benson was taken over by the state of Arizona and rebuilt into a section of SR 76. The newly rebuilt section of road began at I-10, traveling north then curving west continuing briefly before reverting to a county maintained road in Pomerene. Though part of SR 76, Pomerene Road was never signed unlike the San Manuel section. Construction on the route through Redfield Canyon in Pinal County was started, but never finished. The unpaved grading was left abandoned and is still unused to this day, ending abruptly in the middle of nowhere.

In 1974, the section of SR 76 between SR 77 and San Manuel Mine was retired from the state highway system and handed over to Pinal County. Any hope of SR 76 ever being completed to Benson faded in 1988, when ADOT cancelled the proposed extension all together. The short section of SR 76 that was completed near San Manuel was decommissioned as a state highway that same year. The unsigned section of Pomerene Road near Benson was also retired from the state highway system. All right of way ADOT had acquired to construct the highway between Benson and SR 77 was also given away.

Major intersections
The following represents SR 76 as it was in 1988 prior to decommissioning.

State Route 81

State Route 81 was a state highway in eastern Arizona that served Lyman Lake State Park from 1962–2003, traversing  from its start at U.S. Route 180 / U.S. Route 191 between St. Johns and Springerville to Lyman Lake.  The Arizona Department of Transportation turned the road over to the Arizona State Parks Department in June 2003 as it was contained within a state park.

SR 81 was the shortest state highway in Arizona before State Route 280 was established in 1976. SR 81, while short, served as one of the original state routes from 1927. The route was originally a major highway stretching from Douglas to Safford. In 1934 it took over the old stretch of State Route 71 north to Sanders, but this entire route became part of U.S. Route 666 in 1938, and subsequently renumbered to U.S. Route 191 in 1992.

State Route 84A

State Route 84A was a branch of State Route 84 between Tucson and South Tucson beginning at SR 84 on Casa Grande Highway (now West Miracle Mile) and continuing south along what is now I-10 to an interchange with US 80, US 89 and SR 84 at 6th Avenue and Benson Highway. SR 84A was also known by the names Tucson Limited Access Highway and Tucson Freeway. Construction on SR 84A was approved in 1948, but wasn't started until December 27, 1950. Funding was initially obtained through a 1948 Tucson city bond issue. SR 84A was opened in segments, with the first section between SR 84 and Congress Street opening on December 20, 1951. The Santa Cruz River through Tucson was diverted into a man made channel during the construction of SR 84 to keep the river from flooding the new highway. Though incomplete, all segments of the highway were opened to traffic by 1956. SR 84A was added to the Interstate Highway System in 1958 and work immediately began on converting the incomplete limited access highway into a full section of I-10. Conversion work was completed in 1961, officially making SR 84A a section of I-10. The SR 84A designation was decommissioned in favor of I-10 on October 11, 1963.

Major intersections
The following represents SR 84A as it was in 1958, shortly before conversion work began to turn it into I-10.

State Route 89L

State Loop Route 89 (SR 89L) was a state highway in Page, Arizona.  Though the number indicated that it was a loop for State Route 89, that is incorrect.  It was in fact a business loop for U.S. Route 89 through the town of Page, Arizona.  It did not intersect SR 89.  Moreover, it was the only Arizona state highway known to have used the "L" suffix. SR 89L was removed from the state highway system in 2005.

State Route 93

State Route 93 was a state highway in Arizona that existed from 1946 to 1985.  The route was cosigned with other highways along nearly all of its route from Kingman to the border at Nogales. State Route 93 was the original designation for the highway from Kingman to Wickenburg, which was built in 1946. At some point prior to 1964 the northern terminus of the state route was moved south to the unnamed desert junction with U.S. 89 just north of Wickenburg, and the southern terminus of U.S. 93 was moved route south to the U.S. 89 junction. At that junction a driver would pass from U.S. 93 onto State Route 93. When U.S. 89 was reduced to state highway status in the 1990s, U.S. 93's southern terminus was moved south a few miles to U.S. 60 in Wickenburg. For some unknown reason, the Arizona Highway Department either never sought, or was never granted, U.S. Highway status for Route 93 across the rest of the state.

State Route 153

State Route 153, also known as the Sky Harbor Expressway, was a state highway in Maricopa County, Arizona, that used to run from the intersection of 44th Street and Washington Street in Phoenix south to University Drive. SR 153 was also a north–south route that skirts the eastern edge of Phoenix Sky Harbor International Airport, and along with SR 143, SR 153 served a portion of East Valley residents with access to the airport. The majority of them used SR 143 instead, because of its quick access to and from Interstate 10 and Loop 202. SR 153 did, however, provide a direct link between east Phoenix, such as office developments in the Southbank commercial project, and the city of Tempe.

State Route 160

State Route 160 was an east–west state highway in north-central Arizona, starting in the city of Payson and ending in the city of Show Low, traveling along much of the Mogollon Rim. It first appeared on a state map in 1955 and was decommissioned in 1967 when State Route 260 took over its route, because U.S. Route 160 was extended into Arizona on a different alignment in the northeastern corner of the state.

State Route 164

State Route 164 was a  state highway in the northern part of the state of Arizona.  It had two routes in its brief history.  From 1961 to 1962, it started in the city of Flagstaff, at U.S. 66 and U.S. 89 and ended at the town of Valle, at its junction with State Route 64. The route then became part of U.S. Route 180, when it was extended further west. The number was reused on U.S. Route 164 in 1964.

State Route 166

State Route 166, also known as SR 166, was a state highway in the north-central part of Arizona, starting at a junction with U.S. Route 66  and ended at the Walnut Canyon National Monument.  It first appeared on a state map in 1957 and was decommissioned in 1970 when the route through the national monument was taken over by the Forest Service. It also appeared in older state maps on a route from Winslow  to Second Mesa. Also known as the Winslow-Toreva Highway, the route became a part of State Route 65, but then State Route 87.  There is a historical marker about this highway north of Winslow.

State Route 170

State Route 170, also known as SR 170, was a north–south state highway in eastern Arizona. SR 170 was first added to the state highway system on July 1, 1955. It was supplementary to U.S. Route 70, connecting US 70 to the town of San Carlos on the San Carlos Indian Reservation. The route was decertified on February 18, 2005. The road still exists today as BIA Route 170.

Major intersections

State Route 172

State Route 172 was a state highway along the western part of Arizona.  It was established for a route from the town of Parker to Parker Dam, along the Colorado River.  It existed between 1958–1962. After the dam was completed the route was decertified. It was instead extended to US 66. The road up to the dam site still exists today as a county route. It was the only spur route of State Route 72. In 1962, this route became part of State Route 95.

Junction list

State Route 173

State Route 173 was a north–south state highway in north-central Arizona, that connected Show Low and McNary Jct., now known as Hon Dah. The route and travels along part of the Mogollon Rim.  It first appeared on a state map in 1946 and became part of State Route 260 in 1972. This route was a spur of State Route 73 which was the eastern terminus.

State Route 279

State Route 279 was a state route that originally ran from U.S. Route 89A (present-day State Route 89A) in Cottonwood to downtown Camp Verde.  The route first appeared in the state map in 1955 and was decertified when State Route 260 was extended to the west on December 15, 1989. The entire route was replaced by State Route 260 when the 260 designation was extended from Payson across State Route 87 and the General Crook Trail. Although most of SR 279 was replaced by SR 260, there are two separate parts where the new highway does not run on top of the original. The first stretch is in Cottonwood on Camino Real heading south from US 89A, where the road continues into SR 260 according to most maps; however, the pavement ends at Odgen Ranch Road. The second stretch is on the western side of Camp Verde. An old loop road labeled "Old Highway 279" runs from SR 260 at the picnic tables to the west, returning to SR 260 before reaching I-17. This segment is not paved along its entire length.

Major intersections

State Route 280

State Route 280 was a state highway in Yuma County, Arizona that ran from its junction with Interstate 8 in Yuma to the Interstate 8 business loop (which was up until 1977, US 80).  The route was turned over to the city of Yuma on April 20, 2007 for maintenance.  The road is now Avenue 3E, yet signage for SR 280 remains, including exit signs for Avenue 3E on Interstate 8.

SR 280 was the shortest state highway in Arizona, .  It existed wholly within the city of Yuma and served the Yuma International Airport.

State Route 360

State Route 360 was a state route located in the Phoenix, Arizona area of the United States.  From 1970 to 1992, SR 360 was assigned along the Superstition Freeway from Interstate 10 in Tempe through Mesa to U.S. Route 60 in Apache Junction. In 1992, US 60, which entered the Phoenix area on surface streets north of SR 360, was realigned onto the Superstition Freeway, replacing SR 360 in its entirety.

State Route 364

State Route 364, also known as SR 364, was a state highway in the northeastern corner of the state of Arizona, starting in the town of Teec Nos Pos and ending at the state-line near the Four Corners. It first appeared on a state map in 1962 and was decommissioned in 1964 when the road was renumbered to U.S. Route 164. Its parent route was State Route 64 and a majority of its historical route was also taken by U.S. Route 164 around the same time. U.S. Route 164 was transferred to U.S. Route 160 in 1970.

State Route 464

State Route 464 was a state highway in the northeastern corner of the state of Arizona, starting in the town of Kayenta and ending at the town of Mexican Hat.  It was a sister route of State Route 64.  It first appeared on a state map in 1962 and was decommissioned in 1970 when the route was renumbered to U.S. Route 163.  The route goes through Monument Valley.

State Route 504

It continued on as State Road 504 into New Mexico. It first appeared on a state map in 1965 and was decommissioned around 1989 when the route was renumbered to U.S. Route 64. It was the shortest state highway in Arizona during its entire existence.

State Route 789

State Route 789 was a state highway in the eastern part of the state of Arizona, starting in the town of Nogales and ending at the New Mexico state line near Gallup on old U.S. Route 66 (presently Interstate 40).  The route was cosigned with other routes, including U.S. Route 89 North from Nogales to Tucson, U.S. Route 80/U.S. Route 89 north from Tucson to U.S. Route 60 and U.S. Route 70 at Florence Junction, east on 60/70 to Globe and then 60 past Show Low to State Route 61, then east on 61 to U.S. 666 north of Springerville, where it overlapped U.S. 666 and U.S. 66 to Gallup N.M.  It first appeared on an Arizona state map in 1956 and was decommissioned around 1965 when the route was decertified.

State Route 789 was a leg of a proposed U.S. 789, a number proposed for the Canada to Mexico Highway. Boosters wanted to route this new highway marked from Nogales, Arizona, north to Sweetgrass, Montana. Since the highway was to be routed along existing U.S. highways for the majority of its journey, an application for this route to be signed as a U.S. highway was denied by AASHTO. One remnant of U.S. 789 in Wyoming remains to this day as Wyoming 789.

U.S 789 was to continue north with U.S. 666 through Farmington into Cortez, Colorado. U.S. 160 and State Route 789 turned east to serve Durango.

At Durango, State Route 789 turned north again, this time via U.S. 550. At Montrose, State Route 789 followed U.S. 50 northwest to Grand Junction, then turned east again, this time via U.S. 6-24 (now Interstate 70). At Rifle, State Route 789 turned north along Colo. 13, which took State Route 789 to its present Wyoming routing at Baggs. State Route 789 is still designated through Wyoming today; see the routing section above. North of Frannie, State Route 789 continued into Montana via U.S. 310 to Laurel. State Route 789 turned east via U.S. 10-212 (now Interstate 90 and U.S. 212) into Billings. U.S. 87 and State Route 789 merged from Billings all the way to Great Falls, which brought SR 789 westward again. Then State Route 789 turned due north along U.S. 91 (now I-15) to its end at Sweetgrass, Montana.

As the Association of American State Highway Administrators never approved the concept of U.S. 789, all the state route segments started to disappear, with State Route 789 decertified about 1965.

The only stand-alone section of putative U.S. 789 is a section of Wyoming 789.

References

Notes

External links
Arizona Roads